20 Years of Jethro Tull is a 1988 boxed set which spans the first twenty years of Jethro Tull. It was issued as five LPs: Radio Archives, Rare Tracks, Flawed Gems, Other Sides of Tull, and The Essential Tull. It was simultaneously released as both a 3CD and a 3-cassette set, titled 20 Years of Jethro Tull: The Definitive Collection.

All three versions were housed in a 12x12inch cardboard-box, with 24-page booklet, the CD and cassette versions having a black plastic tray.

A single CD sampler and a double LP album were also created, titled 20 Years of Jethro Tull: Highlights.

Release details
(UK) 27 June 1988
(US) 21 June 1988

CD track listing
The track numbers shown below are for the three-CD Definitive Edition.
All songs written by Ian Anderson unless noted.

Disc one
Radio Archives and Rare Tracks

Disc two
Flawed Gems and Other Sides of Tull

Disc three
The Essential Tull

LP Track listing
The track numbers shown below are for the five LP set. Each LP having sides A & B.

Record 1
The Radio Archives
 A
 "Song for Jeffrey"
 "Love Story"
 "Fat Man"
 "Bourée" (Instrumental)
 "Stormy Monday Blues"
 "A New Day Yesterday"
 B
 "Cold Wind to Valhalla"
 "Minstrel in the Gallery"
 "Velvet Green"
 "Grace"
 "The Clasp"
 "Pibroch (Pee Break) / Black Satin Dancer (Instrumental)"
 "Fallen on Hard Times"

Record 2
The Rare Tracks (Released But Only Just)
 A
 "Jack Frost and the Hooded Crow"
 "I'm Your Gun"
 "Down at the End of Your Road"
 "Coronach"
 "Summerday Sands"
 "Too Many Too"
 "March the Mad Scientist
 B
 "Pan Dance"
 "Strip Cartoon"
 "King Henry's Madrigal"
 "A Stitch in Time"
 "17"
 "One for John Gee"
 "Aeroplane"
 "Sunshine Day"

Record 3
Flawed Gems (Dusted Down)
 A
 "Lick Your Fingers Clean"
 "The Chateau D'Isaster Tapes"
 a) "Scenario"
 b) "Audition"
 c) "No Rehearsal"
 "Beltane"
 "Crossword"
 B
 "Saturation"
 "Jack-A-Lynn"
 "Motoreyes"
 "Blues Instrumental (Untitled)"
 "Rhythm in Gold"

Record 4
The Other Sides of Tull
 A
 "Part of the Machine"
 "Mayhem, Maybe"
 "Overhang"
 "Kelpie"
 "Living in These Hard Times"
 "Under Wraps 2"
 B
 "Only Solitaire"
 "Cheap Day Return"
 "Wond'ring Aloud"
 "Dun Ringill"
 "Salamander"
 "Moths"
 "Nursie"
 "Life's a Long Song"
 "One White Duck / 010 = Nothing at All"

Record 5
The Essential Tull
 A
 "Songs from the Wood"
 "Living in the Past"
 "Teacher"
 "Aqualung"
 "Locomotive Breath"
 B
 "Witch's Promise"
 "Bungle in the Jungle"
 "Farm on the Freeway"
 "Thick as a Brick"
 "Sweet Dream"

See also
20 Years of Jethro Tull (1988) (video)
20 Years of Jethro Tull: Highlights (1988)

Notes

"Sunshine Day" was the first single released by Tull, on 16 February 1968.
"The Chateau D'Isaster Tapes" comprises three sections: "Scenario", "Audition" and "No Rehearsal". These later appeared as separate tracks on Nightcap.
Many of these tracks are currently available on the remastered editions of Jethro Tull's studio albums.
"17" and "A Stitch in Time" are shortened compared to the original 7" version (6:07 and 4:20 respectively). The original version of "17" was released on the Collector's Edition of Stand Up, released October 2010. The full-length version of "A Stitch In Time" was released on the 2019 collector's edition of Stormwatch.

External links

Jethro Tull (band) compilation albums
1988 compilation albums
Chrysalis Records compilation albums